Manzhouli is a sub-prefectural city located in Hulunbuir prefecture-level city, Inner Mongolia Autonomous Region, China. Located on the border with Russia, it is a major land port of entry.

History 
In ancient times the area was inhabited by the Donghu, Xiongnu, Xianbei, Khitan, Jurchen, Mongols and Manchu. During the decline of China's last dynasty, the Russian Empire forced the Qing (1644–1912) to cede the Outer Manchurian territory in the 1858 Treaty of Aigun. That treaty effectively made the Argun River, which originates in this area, the border between China and Russia.

In 1901, the China Far East Railway was completed in accordance with the Sino-Russian Secret Treaty of 1896, linking Siberia, northeast China ("(Inner) Manchuria"), and the Russian Far East. A settlement then formed around Manchzhuriya Station, the first stop within Manchuria for Russians. It was the beginning of the modern city of Manzhouli and the name of Manzhouli came from Russian Манжули (Manzhuli).

In 1905, Manzhouli was designated a trading center, greatly boosting Manzhouli's growth. In 1908 the Manzhouli customs was set up. Under the Republic of China, Manzhouli (under the name Lubin []) came under the jurisdiction of the province of Hsingan.  In 1927, Manzhouli was designated as a city. Although with Hsingan and surrounding areas, Manzhouli came under Japanese control in 1931, and was part of the Empire of Manchuria from 1932 to 1945. It became part of Inner Mongolia under China from 1946.

In 1992, Manzhouli became one of the first land border cities opened up by the People's Republic of China. It has since experienced somewhat of a boom as a center of border trade between China and Russia. In 2017, the Manzhouli Stadium opened. The football stadium has a capacity of 20,153.

Geography and climate 

Manzhouli is located in the western part of the Hulunbuir prefecture-level city. The Russian townlet of Zabaykalsk is situated immediately north of Abagaitu Islet and Manzhouli.

Manzhouli is located on the Hulunbuir grasslands.

Manzhouli has a rather dry, monsoon-influenced humid continental climate that borders extremely closely on a semi-arid climate (Köppen Dwb/BSk), with temperatures in winter capable of plummeting below . However, in each month there is more than 55% of possible sunshine, and over three-fourths of annual precipitation occurs from June to August.

Administration 
Manzhouli is divided into ten subdistricts and one town. Six of the subdistricts of Manzhouli are grouped into Jalainur District. Technically however, only a prefecture-level city (half a level higher than Manzhouli) can have districts, so Jalainur District belongs to Hunlunbuir administratively though it is under Manzhouli's administration and covered in the statistics of Manzhouli.

Tourism 

The border crossing with Russia is a tourist attraction. The Manzhouli China-Russia Border Tourist Area is a destination that brings together the border gate, a giant Matryoshka doll shaped hotel, and park filled with Matryoshka dolls. Other attractions within the scenic area are the No 41 Border Monument and the Locomotive Square. It has been rated as a AAAAA (5A) tourist attraction.

Manzhouli Ice & Snow Festival takes place every winter from some time in February to early March. This is a smaller version of the Harbin International Ice and Snow Sculpture Festival.

There is a replica of the Soviet World War II monument, The Motherland Calls.

Economy 
Manzhouli is China's busiest land port of entry, and is responsible for 60% of all imports from and exports to Eastern Europe.

Demographics 

Ninety-five percent of Manzhouli's population is Han Chinese. The remainder are Buryat, Russian, Mongol, Manchu, or of other ethnicities.

Media 
Much of the plot of the 2018 film An Elephant Sitting Still revolves around a number of characters traveling to a circus in Manzhouli.

Transportation

Railway

Trains from Beijing to Moscow on the Trans-Manchurian branch of the Trans-Siberian Railway pass through Manzhouli Railway Station. There are also tourist lines to Chita, Krasnokamensk, Irkutsk, and Ulan Ude.

A break of gauge multi-modal transshipment facility was completed in 2008 across the Russian border in Zabaikalsk.

Air
Manzhouli Xijiao Airport is located in the western part of the city. Passengers can fly to Beijing and Inner Mongolia's capital city Hohhot from the airport as well as the Russian city of Chita and the Mongolian capital city Ulaanbaatar via Choibalsan.

Highway
By China National Highway 301 linked to Inner Mongolia and Heilongjiang cities.

Sister cities 
Manzhouli is twinned with the following sister cities.

References

External links 

Official Site (Simplified Chinese)
Information Portal (Simplified Chinese)
Manzhouli : Where the Clock Always Strikes Nine Manzhouli: Photos and observations
Manzhouli : City of the Plain Pictures and Stories of a trip to Manzhouli at www.pocopico.com
St. Jonah of Manchuria (Russian Orthodox Saint who lived and died in Manzhouli)
Post codes of Inner Mongolia  (English)

Cities in Inner Mongolia
China–Russia border crossings
Hulunbuir